Abaera is a genus of moths of the family Pyralidae.

Species
Abaera aurofusalis Hampson, 1906
Abaera chalcea Hampson, 1897
Abaera nactalis Walker, 1859

References

Chrysauginae
Pyralidae genera